Jane O'Hara (born 24 July 1951) is a Canadian author, journalist and former professional tennis player.

A right-handed player from Toronto, Ontario, O'Hara appeared in 18 Federation Cup ties for Canada between 1969 and 1975. Her best grand slam performance came at the 1970 US Open, where she reached the round of 16.

O'Hara was a sports editor for the Ottawa Sun, the first woman to hold this role for a major Canadian newspaper. She was inducted into the Tennis Canada Hall of Fame in 2002.

See also
List of Canada Fed Cup team representatives

References

External links
 
 
 

1951 births
Living people
Canadian female tennis players
Canadian women journalists
Journalists from Toronto
Tennis players from Toronto